Rhododendron ochraceum (峨马杜鹃) is a rhododendron species native to Chongqing (Nanchuan), southern Sichuan, and northeastern Yunnan, China, where it grows at altitudes of . The flowers are crimson.

Synonyms
 Rhododendron ochraceum var. ochraceum

References
 Rehder & E. H. Wilson in Sargent, Pl. Wilson. 1: 534. 1913.
 The Plant List
 Flora of China
 Hirsutum

ochraceum